Produced by J.C.Staff and directed by Yoshitomo Yonetani, the series was first announced in October 2014 by Shueisha. The series was broadcast in Japan on TBS from April 4 to September 26, 2015 with additional broadcasts on MBS, CBC, BS-TBS, and Animax. The video streaming service Crunchyroll simulcast the series with English subtitles to the United States, Canada, Australia, New Zealand, South Africa, Latin America, Europe (excluding French speaking territories and Italian speaking territories), the Middle East, and North Africa. Sentai Filmworks licensed the series for digital and home video distribution in North America. A second season named Food Wars! Shokugeki no Soma The Second Plate aired from July 2 to September 24, 2016. The first cour of the third season, titled Food Wars! Shokugeki no Soma: The Third Plate, aired from October 4 to December 20, 2017. The second half aired from April 9 to June 25, 2018.  A fourth season entitled Food Wars! Shokugeki no Soma: The Fourth Plate aired from October 12 to December 28, 2019.  A fifth and final season entitled Food Wars! Shokugeki no Soma: The Fifth Plate aired from April 11 to September 26, 2020.

Series overview

Episode list

Season 1 (2015)

Season 2: The Second Plate (2016)

Season 3: The Third Plate (2017–18)

Season 4: The Fourth Plate (2019)

Season 5: The Fifth Plate (2020)

OVAs

Songs
Opening theme

Ending themes

Notes

References

External links
Official website

Lists of anime episodes
Food Wars!: Shokugeki no Soma episode lists